Trader Mill is located in the village of Sibsey, Lincolnshire. It's one of two windmills which were grinding flour for the local community. Rhodes Mill (the second of the two) has been converted into a house.  Built in 1877 by Saunderson of Louth in the typical Lincolnshire style, since then it has been restored and is now owned by English Heritage and managed by an independent party. It is a six-storey windmill with complete gear, six sails and fantail which still works today. It is a Grade I listed building.

The windmill is one of the very few six-sailed mills still remaining in England.
The mill itself is not exceptionally tall and in fact stands only six floors high above ground and the height to the top of the mill's cap is a mere 74 feet 3 inches. However the slenderness of the tower combined with the flat landscape which surrounds the mill give the illusion that Sibsey is larger than it actually is. The slim central tower also makes the sails look enormous in comparison.

The mill worked until 1954 (although with only four sails in its later years) following which it was allowed to fall into disrepair. It has now been restored to full working order and today produces a wide range of organic flours.

The mill features in the CBeebies series Baby Jake where location filming for the series took place in the late summer of 2010.

References

External links

 
  Sibsey Trader Mill page on English Heritage site
 Official website of Sibsey Trader Windmill
 Page at Geograph with several images
 Sibsey Trader Windmill - unofficial website

Windmills in Lincolnshire
Grade I listed buildings in Lincolnshire
English Heritage sites in Lincolnshire
Museums in Lincolnshire
Mill museums in England
Grade I listed windmills
Windmills completed in 1877
1877 establishments in England